Hand Drawn Dracula (HDD) is a Toronto-based independent record label. Artists who have released music on the label include Beliefs, Breeze, Brian Borcherdt, Bruce Peninsula, By Divine Right, Chastity, Dusted, Julie Fader, No Joy, Postdata, Tallies, Vallens and Wintersleep.

HDD Projects includes music by Black Moth Super Rainbow, Holy Fuck, Sebastien Grainger and Shugo Tokumaru.

Artists

Beliefs
Bishop Morocco
Black Moth Super Rainbow (Vicious Circles Project)
Brian Borcherdt
Breeze
Bruce Peninsula
By Divine Right
Chastity
Ora Cogan
Kyle Edward Connolly
Contrived
Cousins
Deliluh
Deserts (formerly Bad Tits) feat. Josh Reichmann & Sebastien Grainger
Doomsquad
Dopes (aka Josh Reichmann)
Dusted (feat. Brian Borcherdt)
Etiquette
Julie Fader
Fresh Snow
Greys
His Clancyness
Holy Fuck
Little Girls
Mausoleum
Praises
Michael Peter Olsen
Nailbiter
No Joy
Off the International Radar
Postdata
Praises
Prince Josh
Josh Reichmann
Rolemodel
Sahara
The Seams
Tallies
Tasseomancy
Shugo Tokumaru (Vicious Circles Project)
Vallens
Wintersleep
Wish
Yi

References

External links
 Hand Drawn Dracula

Canadian independent record labels
Indie rock record labels
Alternative rock record labels
Companies based in Toronto
Online music stores of Canada